Originating from Pavagadh in the Panchmahal District of Gujarat, the Vishwamitri River flows mainly through the west of the city of Vadodara. The name of this river is said to have been derived from the name of the great saint Vishwamitra. Two other tributaries namely Dhadhar and Khanpur merge into it before it amalgamates with the Gulf of Khambhat. Human settlement dating back to 1000 B.C has been found on the bank of river Vishwamitri which ascertains the existence of Stone Age Era. Also in the beginning of the Christian era, a small township was developed on a mound on the banks of this river which later came to be known as Ankotakka (currently known as Akota) while the mound is popular as Dhantekri. The Vishwamitri River was key to the settlement of Vadodara.

This river system includes three major tributaries: Vishwamitri, Dhadhar and Jambuva. All the three tributaries originate from Pavagadh hills and Jambughoda forests. This river system includes the Sayaji Sarovar on the Vishwamitri River near Ajwa, and the Dev Dam on the Dhadhar Branch.  Its flow is from East to West in between two large perennial rivers Mahi and Narmada. The Vishwamitri River banks are home to a lot of places of historical importance like Chhatri, Pratappura Sarovar, Old Bridge, Suspension Bridge, Boat House. Vishwamitri is a home to the mugger or marsh crocodiles which (Crocody-lus palustris) is one of the threatened reptile species in India and legally protected under Schedule I of the Indian Wildlife (Protection) Act, 1972. In spite of heavy pollution load and large human disturbances the presence of the crocodile in large numbers indicate the unique ecological significance of this river.

Dams and sarovars

Ajwa Dam 
This dam is built in the early 20th century by Maharaja Sayajirao Gaekwad III. It solves the purpose of providing water to the vadodara city. Height of the dam is 211 feet above sea level and its 5 km long. It has 62 gates and directly connected to Vishwamitri river. Though Vishwamitri river is seasonal river so Sardar Sarovar's one branch is required to fulfil the need whenever needed. Also reports says that it is the home of more than 300 crocodiles.

Pratappura Sarovar 
This sarovar is built by Maharaja Sayajirao Gaekwad III. It is also known as Pratapsinh Tank. The main purpose to build this sarovar is to supply water in Ajwa Reservoir. There are 7 gates on sarovar from which 3 gates are connected to the Vishwamitri River. Whenever an emergency occurs, where the Ajwa Reservoir is full then the excess water is sent off to the Vishwamitri River.

Nearby attractions

Ajwa Gardens 
It is located at 23 km away from Vadodara. Also, Sayaji Sarovar is situated near these gardens. These gardens resemble the Vrindavan Garden, and has many illuminated fountains. There is also a separate musical fountain which is an attraction for the visitors.

Sayaji Baug 
It is also known as kamati baug. It is located on Vishwamitri river. It is built by Maharaja Sayajirao Gaekwad III.  This park contains many fountains, lawns and many types of trees. Apart from all these, it has a zoo, aquarium, toy train, Historical Museum, small Museum of Health and Hygiene and many more. In addition to all, Vadodara Municipal Corporation also built the Floral Clock. This is a major attraction for visitors to Sayaji Baug. It has minute hand and second hand which is constructed on 20 ft diameter dial. To give a more natural look to this clock all the machinery is underground.

Suspension Bridge 
As Vishwamitri river flows through the park there is a need of path from the zoo to the park. This was the main purpose to build this bridge. Initially, It was designed by Gaekwad III but in 1964, the bridge crumbled down due to heavy rush in the garden during the Fugga Agiyaras Festival.  After this event Vadodara Municipal Corporation has decided to make a similar bridge at the same place. Now It has become a major attraction for the park.

Chhatri 
It is an ornate structure built on the Vishwamitri bridge in Vadodara city. The structure was commissioned by Maharaja Sayajirao Gaekwad III. The structure is like an octagonal structure. It has eight pillars. It is made up of stone from Saurashtra.

Boat House 
It is located on the banks of Vishwamitri River. It is near the Sangramsinh Gaekwad Sports Academy. The main reason to put this as an attraction for visitors because of its carved eaves and finials.

Water Pollution and Flooding Issues 
The Vishwamitri river system which flows through the heart of the city of Vadodara has over the years suffered due to urbanization and industrialization. Despite having multiple dams on the river system, it remains subject to floods and thus suffers floodplain encroachment and storm water outfalls. Neglect towards the maintenance of the river and release of sewage waters, industrial effluents and other sources of pollution has led to the deterioration.

Some of the major gauge stations built on this river to keep floods in check are Ajwa, Pratappura, City Bridge, Bhaniara, Dhanora, Ghansarvav, Haripura, Vadadala, Shivrajpur in Vadodara and Halol and Deo Dam in Panchmahal.

According to a study done by School of Natural Resources and Environment, University of Michigan and commissioned by ASP(Amrut Sitaram Pradhan) Foundation, the major causes of the degradation are improper sewage management, increased impervious surface and deforestation throughout the watershed, encroachment within the floodplain, lack of concern for ecological processes, invasive species, open dumping of solid waste and lack of sensitivity for historical context in development.

Since 1994, there have been more than 8 floods in this river. The river not only floods the low lying parts of the city but also endangers the crocodiles living in the river and is a cause for animal-people conflict as these crocodiles are now in human occupied territory. Vadodara Municipal Corporation (VMC) has started a Vishwamitri Riverfront Development Project(VDRP) FOR the development of Vishwamitri River and for control of floods

Vaho Vishwamitri Abhiyan 
This Abhiyaan(campaign) is started to majorly focus on developing a Bioshield on the banks of Vishwamitri River. Targeted area is from Pavagadh hills to Bay of Khambhat. The main purpose of this abhiyaan (campaign) is environmental protection and water conservation. This will lead to better animal habitat and it also tries to improve the quality of organic farming. Under this Abhiyaan, Drones are used for plantation purpose. There are many tree plantation workshops were organized as a part of this project.

The main purpose of this abhiyaan is environmental protection and water conservation of the river and its surrounding areas. The main focus of this Abhiyaan(campaign) is developing a bioshield on the banks of Vishwamitri River and the major areas targeted are from Pavagadh Hills to the Gulf of Khambhat. The campaign aims to better the animal habitat and also improve the quality of organic farming. Drones are used for plantation purposes and many tree plantation workshops were organized as a part of this project.

Technical experts in GOG, GOI and the World Bank have appreciated and accepted the holistic plan as technically feasible and beneficial.

References 

Rivers of Gujarat
Vadodara
Rivers in Buddhism
Rivers of India